Synemin, also known as desmuslin, is a protein that in humans is encoded by the SYNM gene. Synemin is an intermediate filament (IF) family member. IF proteins are cytoskeletal proteins that confer resistance to mechanical stress and are encoded by a dispersed multigene family. This protein has been found to form a linkage between desmin, which is a subunit of the IF network, and the extracellular matrix, and provides an important structural support in muscle.

Function 

Synemin is an intermediate filament (IF) and, like other IFs, primarily functions to integrate mechanical stress and maintain structural integrity in eukaryotic cells. While it has been observed in a variety of cell types, it has been best studied in the sarcomere of skeletal myocytes. It localizes at the Z-disk and has been shown to bind to α-dystrobrevin, α-actinin, and desmin to act as a mechanical linker in transmitting force laterally throughout the tissue, especially between the contractile myofibrils and extracellular matrix. Synemin contributes to linkage between costameres and the contractile apparatus in skeletal muscle of synemin null animals. Synemin plays an important regulatory role in the heart and the consequences of its absence are profound.

Properties 

Synemin has properties very similar to the intermediate filament syncoilin. In particular, it binds to α-dystrobrevin in the dystrophin-associated protein complex to act as a mechanical "linker" between the myofibrillar network and the cell membrane.

Splice variants 

Three splice variant isoforms of synemin exist, α and β and L. Both isoforms have a very short N-terminal domain of 10 amino acids and a long C-terminal domain consisting of 1243 amino acids for the α isoform and 931 amino acids for the β isoform. An intronic sequence of the synemin β isoform is used as a coding sequence for synemin α.

Cancer 
SYNM gene has been observed progressively downregulated in Human papillomavirus-positive neoplastic keratinocytes derived from uterine cervical preneoplastic lesions at different levels of malignancy. For this reason, SYNM is likely to be associated with tumorigenesis and may be a potential prognostic marker for uterine cervical preneoplastic lesions progression.

History 

The origin of the synemin/desmuslin naming convention is quite complex. In 1980, synemin was first identified in avian smooth muscle and was initially described as an IF-associated protein due to its colocalization and copurification with desmin and vimentin.  Subsequent to the cloning of chicken synemin, Mizuno and colleagues reported the cloning of a novel IF protein, human desmuslin, as an α-dystrobrevin-interacting protein. Sequence analysis showed that human desmuslin was 32% identical and 11% similar to the amino acid sequence of chicken synemin, while the IF proteins vimentin and desmin are more than 80% identical across the same species. Although several parts were very similar between human desmuslin and chicken synemin, the low degree of conservation between these two proteins compared to other cloned IF proteins suggested that synemin was not the human desmuslin orthologue. In addition, unlike chicken synemin, in vitro coimmunoprecipitation assays could not detect an interaction between human desmuslin and α-actinin.  In 2001, Titeux and colleagues reported the cloning of the α and β splice-varying isoforms of human synemin and showed that β-synemin was identical to desmuslin. In 2014 was reported the first synemin -/- null animal.

References

External links